The Czech Basketball Federation and The Association of Czech Basketball League Clubs, announced the Czechoslovakian All-20th Century Basketball Team. A total of twenty-five basketball players were selected for the All-Century Team. It was decided by a vote of fans, sports journalists, and basketball experts. The results were announced on Saturday June 16, 2001. Jiri Zidek Sr., was chosen as The Best Czech Basketball Player of the 20th Century.

Czechoslovakian All-20th Century Basketball Team

See also
Czechoslovakia national team
Czech Republic national team
Czech Player of the Year
Slovak Player of the Year
Czechoslovak League career stats leaders

External links
Jiri Zidek (1944), FIBA Europe
Jiri Zidek, euroleague.net
 basketbalistou století zvolen Zídek starší (Czech)
 Jiří Zídek starší je domácím basketbalistou století (Czech)

 
Basketball in Czechoslovakia
European basketball awards